Kaunas pantomime theatre is pantomime theatre in Kaunas, Lithuania. Theatre was established in 1968. Founder and leader of Kaunas Pantomime theatre was artistic director Kestutis Adomaitis (1948–1996). Kaunas Municipality becomes the founder of Kaunas Pantomime Theatre  in 2003. Kaunas Pantomime theatre is the only Lithuanian professional ensemble theatre with a repertoire of this genre only. The theatre performed in many foreign countries, such as Germany, Russia, Romania, Latvia, Syria, Jordan, China, Moldova, Ukraine, Belarus, Poland, Denmark.

External links
Kaunas Pantomime Theatre web site

Establishments in Lithuania
Theatres in Kaunas